Wanderson de Paula Sabino (born 22 June 1977 in Nova Venécia), nicknamed Somália, is a Brazilian striker. He last played for Taboão da Serra.

Career
On 27 April 2009, the right wingback Carlinhos and the forward terminated their contract with Náutico after their bad performances in this first part of the season.

Honours

Club
Feyenoord
Dutch League: 1998–99
Dutch Super Cup: 1999

America
 Campeonato Carioca Série B: 2015

Individual
UAFA Club Cup top goalscorer: 2003 (4 goals)
São Paulo state league's top goalscorer: 2007

External links
CBF Profile 

Guardian Stats Centre 

globoesporte 
 Dutch career stats – Voetbal International

1977 births
Living people
People from Nova Venécia
Association football forwards
Brazilian footballers
Brazilian expatriate footballers
Campeonato Brasileiro Série A players
Campeonato Brasileiro Série B players
Eredivisie players
K League 1 players
Expatriate footballers in Slovenia
Expatriate footballers in the Netherlands
Expatriate footballers in Saudi Arabia
Brazilian expatriate sportspeople in Kuwait
Expatriate footballers in Kuwait
Expatriate footballers in South Korea
Brazilian expatriate sportspeople in Slovenia
Brazilian expatriate sportspeople in the Netherlands
Brazilian expatriate sportspeople in Saudi Arabia
Brazilian expatriate sportspeople in South Korea
América Futebol Clube (MG) players
NK Celje players
Feyenoord players
Excelsior Rotterdam players
Associação Desportiva São Caetano players
Al Hilal SFC players
Goiás Esporte Clube players
Grêmio Foot-Ball Porto Alegrense players
Santos FC players
Busan IPark players
Fluminense FC players
Clube Náutico Capibaribe players
Duque de Caxias Futebol Clube players
Figueirense FC players
Boavista Sport Club players
Ipatinga Futebol Clube players
Bonsucesso Futebol Clube players
America Football Club (RJ) players
Saudi Professional League players
Kuwait SC players
Kuwait Premier League players
Sportspeople from Espírito Santo